Sport New Zealand (Sport NZ) (Māori: Ihi Aotearoa) is a New Zealand Crown entity responsible for governing sport and recreation in New Zealand.

Sport NZ believes sport is an integral part of New Zealand's culture and way of life. The organisation believes whether New Zealanders are playing, coaching, refereeing, volunteering, managing or supporting – the power of sport helps bind communities and the nation together. The organisation also believes sport enriches the economy, improves wellbeing, helps children’s bodies and minds develop, and it makes people more resilient as communities and individuals.

With this in mind, Sport NZ’s vision is to ensure that all New Zealanders have access to sport wherever they live, whoever they are and whatever their ability. The organisation’s wants to see more kids and more adults in sport and recreation, and more winners on the world stage through their subsidiary High Performance Sport New Zealand, which deals with elite athletes.

Sport NZ's vision is 'Everyone, every day, enjoying and excelling though sport and recreation. Sport NZ's mission is 'Creating a sport and recreation environment where more New Zealanders participate, support and win. To achieve these, Sport NZ takes a lead role by providing direction to all sports organisations and challenging the sport and recreation sector to continually improve. They work to help their partners, such as national and regional sports organisations or regional sports trusts, strive to reach their fullest potential for the good of all New Zealanders.

Legislation and functions
The principal governing legislation of Sport NZ is the Sport and Recreation New Zealand Act 2002. As a Crown entity, it is responsible to the Minister of Sport and Recreation via its board of directors.

Section 8 of the Act sets out the functions of Sport New Zealand as the following:
 Develop and implement national policies and strategies for physical recreation and sport
 Allocate funds to organisations and regional bodies in line with its policies and strategies
 Promote and advocate the importance of participation in physical activity by all New Zealanders for their health and well-being
 Promote and disseminate research relevant to physical recreation and sport
 Provide advice to the Minister on issues relating to physical recreation and sport
 Promote and support the development and implementation of physical recreation and sport in a way that is culturally appropriate to Māori
 Encourage participation in physical recreation and sport by Pacific peoples, women, older New Zealanders, and people with disabilities
 Recognise the role of physical recreation and sport in the rehabilitation of people with disabilities
 Facilitate the resolution of disputes between persons or organisations involved in physical recreation and sport
 Work with schools, regional, central, and local government, and physical recreation and sports organisations to ensure the maintenance and development of the physical and organisational infrastructure for physical recreation and sport
 Work with health, education, and other agencies to promote greater participation in physical recreation and sport through policy development, advocacy, and support, in line with the objectives of the New Zealand health strategy
 Provide advice and support for organisations working in physical recreation and sport at national, regional, and local levels
 Facilitate co-ordination between national, regional, and local physical recreation and sport organisations
 Represent the Government’s policy interests in physical recreation and sport internationally.

High Performance Sport New Zealand
High Performance Sport New Zealand (HPSNZ) is the subsidiary of Sport New Zealand responsible for governing New Zealand's high performance sport programme. It was formed in 2011 following the merger of Sport New Zealand's high performance unit with the country's two academies of sport.

References

External links
Sport New Zealand official site
High Performance Sport New Zealand official site

Sports governing bodies in New Zealand
New Zealand Crown agents